Rüschlikon railway station is a railway station in Switzerland, situated near to the banks of Lake Zurich in the municipality of Rüschlikon. The station is located on the Lake Zurich left bank line, which originally formed part of the Zürich to Lucerne main line, although most main line trains now use the alternative Zimmerberg Base Tunnel routing. It is served by lines S8 and S24 of the Zurich S-Bahn.

References

External links 
 
 

Railway stations in the canton of Zürich
Swiss Federal Railways stations
Rüschlikon